Russell Edward Dickerson (born May 7, 1987) is an American country pop singer-songwriter from Union City, Tennessee. Dickerson has released two albums through Triple Tigers. Both have accounted for four singles charting on Hot Country Songs and Country Airplay: "Yours", "Blue Tacoma", "Every Little Thing", and “Love You Like I Used To”.

Biography
Russell Edward Dickerson was born May 7, 1987 in Union City, Tennessee.

He earned a bachelor's degree in music from Belmont University and signed with Creative Artists Agency in 2010. In 2011, he released an extended play, Die to Live Again, and opened for David Nail. He toured with Canaan Smith in 2015, and Thomas Rhett in the summer of 2016. Dickerson also joined Billy Currington on the road in 2016.

In 2015, he released the single "Yours" written by Dickerson, Parker Welling, and Casey Brown. It became the title track to his second extended play, released on January 18, 2016, by Dent Records. The EP debuted at number 14 on the Billboard Top Country Albums chart, selling 2,700 copies in its first week of release. It launched at number 2 in the iTunes Country Store and number 8 in all genres. On October 10, 2016, he signed with Triple Tigers Records which assumed distribution of the single.

In its 39th week on Billboard's Country Airplay chart, Dickerson jumped from number 3 to 1 on the list on January 27, 2018.

The album, Yours was released on October 13, 2017, and premiered at No. 1 on Billboard's Heat Seeker chart. The album peaked at No. 5 on Top Country Albums dated November 4, 2017, with 12,000 equivalent album units in its first week, and includes five songs co-written by Dickerson, containing an acoustic wedding version of the title track "Yours." Due to the popularity of his hit single, he landed on the iTunes Best of 2015 year-end list, TheKnot.com's "Best Wedding Songs of 2016," and Spotify's #SpotifySpotlight 2016; where he later became one of Spotify's RISE artists. Dickerson made his Grand Ole Opry debut on June 3, 2016. An album also titled Yours produced two additional singles in "Blue Tacoma" and "Every Little Thing", which topped the Country Airplay charts as well.

Dickerson's second album, Southern Symphony, came out in late 2020 on Triple Tigers. Its lead single, "Love You Like I Used To", also went to number one on the country music charts. Dickerson and Tyler Hubbard were both featured on Thomas Rhett's 2022 song "Death Row".

Personal life
Dickerson married his wife, Kailey, in April 2013. On September 10, 2020, the couple's first child was born.

Discography

Studio albums

Extended plays

Singles

Music videos

Tours
Supporting
David Nail (2011)
Canaan Smith (2015)
Billy Currington (2016)
Home Team Tour (2017)  with Thomas Rhett
Life Changes Tour (2018) (Select Dates) with Thomas Rhett
Summer Plays on Tour (2018) with Lady A and Darius Rucker
Very Hot Summer Tour (2019) with Thomas Rhett
Worldwide Beautiful Tour (2020) with Kane Brown

References

External links

1987 births
Living people
American country singer-songwriters
American male singer-songwriters
Belmont University alumni
Country musicians from Tennessee
Musicians from Nashville, Tennessee
Singer-songwriters from Tennessee
People from Union City, Tennessee
21st-century American singers
21st-century American male singers
Thirty Tigers artists